Yang Chun is a fictional character in Water Margin, one of the Four Great Classical Novels in Chinese literature. He ranks 73rd among the 108 Liangshan heroes and 37th among the 72 Earthly Fiends. He is nicknamed "White Flower Serpent".

Background
Slender in figure with his arms long and skinny, Yang Chun is nicknamed "White Flower Serpent" for his appearance. He is a good fighter who uses a long sabre.

Originally from Jieliang (解良; in present-day Yuncheng, Shanxi), Yang Chun leads a band of outlaws at Mount Shaohua (少華山; southeast of present-day Hua County, Shaanxi), taking the third position after Zhu Wu and Chen Da. Whenever their grain stock runs low, the three would plunder the nearby counties for replenishment.

Befriending Shi Jin
One day Chen Da goes to raid the well-stocked Huayin County dismissing objection from Zhu Wu, who fears he would run into the formidable fighter Shi Jin of Shi Family Village. As foreseen by Zhu, Chen is captured by Shi when he tries to get through the village.

Yang Chun suggests battling it out with Shi Jin to save Chen Da. But Zhu Wu believes a psychological tactic might work. So the two go to Shi to plead to be arrested as well so as to fulfil their oath of dying together. Moved by their bond, Shi Jin frees Chen Da and befriends the three. Henceforth, the two sides often exchange gifts and visit each other for drink.

One day a hunter finds a reply letter from Mount Shaohua on a servant of Shi Jin, who has fallen drunk in a grove after an errand to invite the outlaws to attend a feast at his master's house. The matter is reported to the authorities, which send an arrest party to Shi's house on the night of the gathering. Finding his manor besieged, Shi Jin burns it down and fights his way out with the bandit chiefs. They get to Mount Shaohua safely, where Shi Jin becomes the chief after failing to locate his teacher Wang Jin in Weizhou.

Joining Liangshan
Shi Jin tries to save a woman abducted by Governor He of Hua Prefecture, or Huazhou, but falls into the latter's trap and is captured. Lu Zhishen, who has come to invite Shi Jin to join the Liangshan Marsh, tries to rescue him but also falls into He's ambush. The Mount Shaohua outlaws turn to Liangshan for help. At Huazhou, the force from Liangshan lure He out of the city and kill him. After Shi and Lu are rescued, the Mount Shaohua bandits, including Yang Chun, are absorbed into Liangshan.

Campaigns and death
Yang Chun is appointed as one of the leaders of the Liangshan cavalry after the 108 Stars of Destiny came together in what is called the Grand Assembly  He participates in the campaigns against the Liao invaders and rebel forces on Song territory following amnesty from Emperor Huizong for Liangshan.

In the attack  on Yuling Pass (昱嶺關; near present-day Zhupu Village, She County, Anhui) in the campaign against Fang La, Yang Chun, Shi Jin and four other heroes face the enemy general Pang Wanchun. Pang kills Shi Jin with a shot while his archers rain arrows on Yang Chun and the rest, killing all of them.

References
 
 
 
 
 
 
 

72 Earthly Fiends
Fictional characters from Shanxi